Edward Dowse (October 22, 1756 – September 3, 1828) was a U.S. Representative from Massachusetts. Born in Charlestown in the Province of Massachusetts Bay, Dowse moved to Dedham in March 1798 to escape the yellow fever epidemic in Boston. He purchased five acres of land on both sides of the Middle Post Road, today known as High Street. He lived in an already existing house at first, and then built a home on the land in 1804.

During his 1817 tour of the country, President James Monroe visited Dedham and stayed in Dowse's home.

After the Revolution, he became a shipmaster and engaged in the East Indian and China carrying trade.  Dowse was elected as a Democratic-Republican to the Sixteenth Congress and served from March 4, 1819, until May 26, 1820, when he resigned. He also served as a representative to the Great and General Court in 1821. He died in Dedham on September 3, 1828. He is interred in the Old Village Cemetery.

Notes

References

Works cited

1756 births
1828 deaths
Democratic-Republican Party members of the United States House of Representatives from Massachusetts
Members of the Massachusetts General Court
Burials at Old Village Cemetery